Grigno (Grigno in local dialect) is a comune (municipality) in Trentino in the northern Italian region Trentino-Alto Adige/Südtirol, located about  east of Trento.

Grigno borders the following municipalities: Castello Tesino, Cinte Tesino, Ospedaletto, Arsiè, Asiago, Cismon del Grappa and Enego. it is home to the Grotta della Bigonda and Grotta Calgeron grotto complexes, as well as two prehistorical archaeological sites (Riparo Dalmeri and Grotta di Ernesto).

References

Cities and towns in Trentino-Alto Adige/Südtirol